The Time Hunter series of books is published by Telos Publishing Ltd. and features the characters Honoré Lechasseur and Emily Blandish from Daniel O'Mahony's Doctor Who novella The Cabinet of Light. Each novella is issued in a standard format paperback format, and a deluxe hardback edition signed by the novella's author.

Novellas 
The series began with The Winning Side by Lance Parkin, following BBC Worldwide's decision not to renew Telos's licence for publishing novellas based on the Doctor Who television series.

The eleven novellas were published on an irregular schedule. Following the publication of this eleventh novella, Telos have announced that the range will temporarily end due to poor sales. Child of Time reveals much of the backstory of the series.

The covers of the standard edition Time Hunter novellas each feature a circle motif containing the year in which the majority of the action of the story takes place.

Although the novellas are not part of the Doctor Who franchise, they have featured familiar characters and concepts from the programme. Aside from Honoré and Emily, the Fendahl appears in Deus Le Volt, and a Daemon appears in Child of Time.  Concepts from the Time Hunter series also feature in the Doctor Who spin-off DVD drama Daemos Rising written by David J. Howe, although neither of the main characters from the book series appear in the DVD.

A character appearing very briefly in The Albino's Dancer may be an unnamed Ninth Doctor, although whether this is true or not is left open to the reader's interpretation.  The character "Dr Smith" who appears in Child of Time appears to be the incarnation of the Doctor first seen in The Cabinet of Light, although his identity with Doctor Who Doctor is now less clear.

Audiobooks
In September 2008, Telos announced that a fan production company, Fantom Films, had been licensed to produce audiobook readings of the Time Hunter novellas for release on CD and as online downloads.  The first two titles, The Cabinet of Light and The Winning Side (read by former Doctor Who actors Terry Molloy and Louise Jameson respectively), were released in November 2008 and releases have continued since.

References

External links 
Telos website

Fantom Films website

 
Novels about time travel
Science fiction book series

pl:Podróże w czasie jako motyw literacki i filmowy
fi:Aikamatkustus fiktiossa